John Woodland "Jack" Welch (born 1946) is a scholar of law and religion. Welch is a member of the Church of Jesus Christ of Latter-day Saints and currently teaches at the J. Reuben Clark Law School (JRCLS) at Brigham Young University (BYU) in Provo, Utah, where he is the Robert K. Thomas University Professor of Law. He is notable for his contributions to LDS (Mormon) scholarship, including his discovery of the ancient literary form chiasmus in the Book of Mormon.

Biography 
Welch was founding director of Foundation for Ancient Research and Mormon Studies (FARMS) and, prior to August 2018, was the Editor-in-Chief of the periodical BYU Studies Quarterly. Welch was director of publications for the Joseph Fielding Smith Institute for Latter-day Saint History.  While serving as a young missionary in Germany, Welch discovered many instances of the chiasmus literary form in the Book of Mormon.  His finding, published in BYU Studies as "Chiasmus in the Book of Mormon" in 1969, and subsequent publications have shaped scholarly inquiry into the linguistic aspects and historical origin of the Book of Mormon.

Welch received bachelor's and master's degrees from BYU (B.A. in History, M.A. in Latin and Greek).  He then studied at Oxford University as a Woodrow Wilson Fellow. Welch received a J.D. from Duke University.  He is the Robert K. Thomas professor of law in the JRCLS.

In 1979, Welch founded FARMS while working as a lawyer in southern California.  He was a member of the board of editors for the Encyclopedia of Mormonism.

Welch was a co-author of Religion and Law: Biblical-Judaic and Islamic Perspectives

He is a contributing scholar for the Joseph Smith Papers Project.

Bibliography
Reexploring the Book of Mormon (1992)
The Allegory of the Olive Tree (1994)
Chiasmus in Antiquity (1998)
Illuminating the Sermon at the Temple and Sermon on the Mount (1998)
Isaiah in the Book of Mormon (1998)
King Benjamin's Speech (1998)
John W. Welch, and J. Gregory Welch, Charting the Book of Mormon (1999)
Chiasmus Bibliography (1999)
King Benjamin's Speech Made Simple (1999)
Pressing Forward with the Book of Mormon (1999)
Daniel H. Ludlow, S. Kent Brown, and John W. Welch, To All the World (2000)
Echoes and Evidences of the Book of Mormon (2002)
Glimpses of Lehi's Jerusalem (2004)
Apostles and Bishops in Early Christianity (2004)
Oliver Cowdery: Scribe, Elder, Witness (2006)
The Legal Cases in the Book of Mormon (2008)
The Sermon at the Temple and the Sermon on the Mount (2010)
The Tree of Life (2011)

References

External links
 
 Howard W. Hunter Law Library Page of Welch has a listing of at least a portion of Welch's published works.
John W. Welch Chiasmus Papers, MSS 3776; L. Tom Perry Special Collections; Harold B. Lee Library; Brigham Young University.
 BYU Studies journal, of which John W. Welch is the editor in chief.
 Chiasmus Resources, a Chiasmus index site maintained by BYU Studies.

1946 births
20th-century Mormon missionaries
Alumni of the University of Oxford
American Latter Day Saint writers
American Mormon missionaries in Germany
Brigham Young University alumni
Brigham Young University faculty
Duke University School of Law alumni
Editors of Latter Day Saint publications
Historians of the Latter Day Saint movement
Living people
Mormon apologists
Mormon studies scholars
American expatriates in the United Kingdom
Latter Day Saints from Utah
Latter Day Saints from California
Latter Day Saints from North Carolina
Book of Mormon scholars